John Aloysius Murphy (21 December 1905 – 18 November 1995) was a  Roman Catholic Church prelate who served firstly as the Bishop of Shrewsbury from 1949 to 1961, then as the Archbishop of Cardiff from 1961 to 1983.

He was born in Birkenhead on the Wirral Peninsula on 21 December 1905, and ordained a priest for the Diocese of Shrewsbury on 21 March 1931. He was appointed Coadjutor Bishop of Shrewsbury and Titular Bishop of Appia on 7 February 1948. His consecration to the Episcopate took place on 25 February 1948, the principal consecrator was Cardinal William Godfrey, Archbishop of Westminster, and the principal co-consecrators were John Edward Petit, Bishop of Menevia and Henry Vincent Marshall, Bishop of Salford. On the death of Ambrose James Moriarty on 3 June 1949, Murphy automatically succeeded as Bishop of Shrewsbury. Twelve years later, he was appointed Archbishop of Cardiff.

Murphy adjusted to the ecumenical climate of Vatican II, for example by accompanying the Abbot of Caldey on a visit to the Llandaff residence of Bishop Glyn Simon, who subsequently as Archbishop of Wales spoke at the Installation (1969) of the Catholic Lord Mayor, Sir Lincoln Hallinan,

He retired on 25 March 1983 and assumed the title Archbishop emeritus of Cardiff. He died on 18 November 1995, aged 89.

References

1905 births
1995 deaths
20th-century Roman Catholic bishops in Wales
People from Birkenhead
20th-century Roman Catholic archbishops in the United Kingdom
Roman Catholic bishops of Shrewsbury
Roman Catholic archbishops of Cardiff
English bishops